Harold Lang (23 August 1905 – 23 April 1991) was an Australian cricketer. He played two first-class matches for Western Australia between 1929/30 and 1931/32.

See also
 List of Western Australia first-class cricketers

References

External links
 

1905 births
1991 deaths
Australian cricketers
Western Australia cricketers